The Egyptian Squash Federation is recognised as the Egyptian national governing body for the sport of squash.

The federation is responsible for the following tasks: 
 Decide public policies that lead to the deployment of squash in the Arab Republic of Egypt and upgradable.
 Administration of squash from the technical aspects, financial and regulatory Puts the different competitions, championships and oversee their implementation.
 Development of the rules governing the affairs of the training and arbitration as well as terms and conditions that must be met by the coaches and referees.
 Preservation of the rules and principles of the international game of squash and protect the hobby.
 The preparation of national teams that represent Egypt in all international forums.
 Approval and registration of players enrolled in Egyptian Squash Federation.
 Sets rules and regulations governing the transfers of players.
 Support the Egyptian representation in international federations, continental and regional presence to ensure Egyptian work on the development of resources.

See also
 Squash in Egypt
 Egypt men's national squash team
 Egypt women's national squash team

References

External links
 Egyptian Squash Federation 
 Egyptian Squash Federation 

Squash in Egypt
National members of the World Squash Federation
Squash